The canton of L'Isle-sur-la-Sorgue is a French administrative division in the department of Vaucluse and region Provence-Alpes-Côte d'Azur.

Composition
At the French canton reorganisation which came into effect in March 2015, the canton was reduced from 9 to 5 communes (population in 2012):
 Châteauneuf-de-Gadagne : 3,279 inhabitants
 Fontaine-de-Vaucluse : 653 inhabitants 
 L'Isle-sur-la-Sorgue : 18,902 inhabitants 
 Saumane-de-Vaucluse : 911 inhabitants 
 Le Thor : 8,416 inhabitants

References

L'Isle-sur-la-Sorgue